Stelligera may refer to:
 Stelligera (sponge), a genus of sponges in the family Stelligeridae
 Stelligera (plant), a genus of plants in the family Amaranthaceae
 Stelligera (fungus), a formerly recognized genus of fungi now included in the genus Lachnocladium